Milky Juicy is an album by folk rock band Tiny Lights, released in 1994 through Doctor Dream Records.

Release and reception 

Nitsuh Abebe of AllMusic gave it two and a half out of five stars, stating that the album contains few redeeming qualities and sounds dull compared to the band's previous output. Trouser Press wrote that "Milky Juicy is the band’s most adventurous, eclectic record. Comfortable in what it can do but undaunted by what it can’t, Tiny Lights rifles through a sample-book’s worth of styles, never sticking with one sound two songs in a row." Spin deemed the album "a whimsical AM-FM radio hybrid circa 1972 with the Beatles, Black Sabbath, Funkadelic, and Dusty Springfield beaming in." The New Yorker called the album "a delight" and a "breezy AM-influenced hodgepodge of rock, folk, jazz, blues, and R&B."

Track listing

Personnel 

Tiny Lights
 Andy Burton – piano
 Donna Croughn – vocals, violin, drums, production
 Andy Demos – drums, clarinet, saxophone
 Dave Dreiwitz – bass guitar, trumpet, vocals
 John Hamilton – guitar, vocals, production
 John Kruth – flute, mandolin
 Catherine Bent – cello

Additional musicians and production
 Laura Vitalo – photography

References 

1994 albums
Tiny Lights albums